The Australian Navy Cadets (ANC) is a voluntary youth organisation owned and sponsored by the Royal Australian Navy. Together with the Australian Air Force Cadets and Australian Army Cadets, it forms the Australian Defence Force Cadets. It hosts over 91 units.

History
The organisation was founded in the early 1900s and officially recognised under the Naval Defence Act in 1910. Prior to 1973, the organisation was known as the Australian Sea Cadet Corps, and was jointly administered by the Royal Australian Navy and the Navy League of Australia. After 1973, the Navy assumed full responsibility for the Corps, which was renamed the Naval Reserve Cadets. The Australian Government review, 'Cadets The Future' recommended a final name change to Australian Navy Cadets in 2000.

Admiral of the Corps

Below is a list of names held by both the Naval League and Defence run/sponsored programs including the original 'Church of England – Boys Naval Brigade' from 1901 to 1911:
 Boys Naval Brigades (Victoria) 1901–1911 (Run in conjunction with the Church of England)
 Australian Naval Cadet Corps ANCC 1907–1950 (Defence)
 Navy League Sea Cadet Corps NLSCC (1920–1950) (Navy League)
 RANR Cadets 1950–1973 (Defence)
 Australian Sea Cadet Corps ASCC (1950–1972) (Navy League)
 (1973– Navy League and Defence cadets merged into one unit, the NRC)
 Naval Reserve Cadets NRC (1972-31 March 2000) (Defence)
 Australian Navy Cadets ANC (1 April 2000 – present) (Defence)

Aims
ANC training is nautical in nature and includes waterborne activities, which can include navigation, communications, first aid, drill, maritime history, firearms proficiency, and adventurous training. The ANC also aims to achieve the following with its training program:
 develop an interest in the Navy and its tradition;
 encourage cadets to continue military or community service;
 give cadets a foundation of military knowledge and discipline;
provide the foundations of life skills;
promote teamwork and critical-thinking;
 develop the qualities of leadership, self-discipline, self-reliance, and initiative; and
 provide training that may later assist in achieving competencies required during Navy induction training.

Organisation

The 91 Training Ships (units) across Australia have a total membership around 400 staff and 2,200 cadets, including several that have been formed in high schools. However, 2012 reporting suggested membership has fallen drastically to about 1,600. These Training Ships are split into 9 Flotillas throughout the country.

The ANC adheres to a rank structure similar to the Royal Australian Navy, with cadets having the opportunity to progress from the rank of cadet recruit to cadet chief petty officer. Each unit has a complement which lays out how many cadets the unit is allowed to carry and how many are allowed at each rank. Training camps and examinations are held for promotion in rank. The structure and organisation of the ANC is based on that of the Royal Australian Navy, but additionally features a large community-involvement component.

Flotillas 
There are currently 9 Flotillas in the Australian Navy Cadets. Each Flotilla has a Flotilla Commander (FLOTCOM) in charge who is the rank of Lieutenant Commander, ANC.

ANC ranks 
Ranks of the Australian Navy Cadets are divided into staff ranks and cadets ranks. Volunteers do not become staff until appointed by the ANC.

Staff ranks
From December 2021, all staff members hold Officer of Cadets (OOC) ranks, with Instructor of Cadets (IOC) ranks becoming inactive.

Example of Use (officer); LCDR Joe Blogg, ANC
Example of Use (Instructor); POANC Joe Blogg

Cadet Ranks

Example of Use; CDTPO Joe Bloggs

Volunteers
 Defence Approved Helper – DAH

Example of Use; Mr Joe Bloggs – DAH

National commanders and directors general
The basic naval reserve cadet (NRC) command structure prior to 2001 was:

Director of Naval Reserves and Cadets (DNRC) was a RANR Officer in Canberra who had overall authority of the Naval Reserve Cadets. Each state had a Senior Officer Naval Reserve Cadets (SONRC) who answered to the LNA or Local Naval Authority usually the Commanding Officer (CO) of the establishment on which the NRCHQ of that state resided. A Cadet Liaison Officer (CLO), usually a RANR Officer, was situated in HMAS Cairns, HMAS Moreton, HMAS Watson, HMAS Lonsdale, HMAS Encounter, HMAS Huon and HMAS Leeuwin (all shore bases at the time). The CLO had responsibility for the liaising between the NRC and RAN in their state. There was no national HQ or national staff until the ANC was established in 2001.

Prior to 2001 the ANC did not have the title or position 'Director General ANC', instead the overall Commander's position was called 'Director of Reserves Navy' which was a RAN – RANR position.

Uniforms/Awards
The uniforms of the Australian Navy Cadets are based on that of the Royal Australian Navy (RAN), with only a few differences such as the shoulder flashes of the ANC reading "AUSTRALIAN NAVY CADETS" as opposed to the RAN's "AUSTRALIA" flashes.

Activities and Training

Courses and Skills
Cadets learn teamwork and leadership skills, and put these into practice at regular weekly parades. Cadets also have the opportunity to attend training camps for the purpose of promotion in rank, standard training, or to gain additional qualifications.

TS Hobart, a dedicated band unit, also offers musical activities as well as the normal cadet curriculum.

ANC and RAN Twinning Program
All ANC units can participate in sea rides on Royal Australian Navy ships, an initiative to provide a link between ANC units and RAN ships.

In January 2019, 30 cadets from NSW experienced a sea ride aboard the MV Sycamore for 6 days, in which they became familiar with life on board. They experienced the different sections of the ship, from getting hands-on doing scullery in the galley to coiling lines with the bosuns to visiting engineering and getting a tour of the engine room . They all experienced standing 1-2 two hour watches per day, with each cadet having the opportunity to do lookout duty and take the helm of the vessel, learning hands-on how to control a ship.

International Exchanges
As the ANC is part of the International Sea Cadet Association, the opportunity is present for members to go on exchange programs with overseas cadet groups.

ANC and Young Endeavour Youth Scheme
The ANC/Young Endeavour Voyage Scheme is a sailing program for Australian Navy Cadets aged 16 and over, focused on building leadership, teamwork and communication skills through sail training. This scheme is being sponsored by the RAN and extends to 24 Australian Navy Cadets and three ANC staff members the chance to participate in two dedicated voyages on STS Young Endeavour. Sponsorship covers all voyage fees, airfares and accommodation. Nominations are sought from cadets over the age of 16 years and placement is offered to the top 24 cadets who can demonstrate outstanding personal and leadership qualities and who have made a valuable contribution to their local community during the past 12 months.

Over the course of the voyage, 24 Navy Cadets and three ANC staff members learn aspects of sailing a 44-metre, square rigged tall ship on the open sea including climbing the two 30 metre masts, setting sails, navigating, keeping watch, taking the helm and helping in the galley. ANC crew are trained by a professional Royal Australian Navy crew who are there to ensure the highest standards of safety and care.

The YEYS staff lead and run the Ship's usual training, games/sport and activity programs, with all ANC staff and cadets coming under the direction and supervision of the Ship's crew. This is not a military program. ANC staff do not have a leadership role while embarked in STS Young Endeavour and fully participate in the ship's youth development program on an equal footing with the cadets whom they would usually lead. The focus of the voyage is on self-development, the atmosphere is informal and all ship's company and youth crew are addressed on a first name basis.

Specialisations
When Cadets complete their basic training, and reach the required rank, they have the opportunity to go and do a specialisation course. Having a specialisation is not necessary to get promoted, but some flotillas will require Able Seamen to do a Leadership And Management course before they can be promoted. Cadets are allowed to have more than one specialisation or category but each cadet will have a primary specialisation. Specialist courses are run on ACTs (as well as GT) which usually happen once a year. The awarding of categories mirrors that of the Royal Australian Navy (RAN) even though sailors in the RAN can only gain one rate at any one time. The specialisations are available to cadets from any rank.

The specialisations available in the Australian Navy Cadets are:

 Seamanship Development Course (SMNS)
 Marine Technician (MT)
 Ceremonial and weapons safety (CWS)
 Cook (CK)
 Communications (COM)
 Musician (MUSN)
 Stores (STR)
 Hydrographic Surveyor (HS)
 Writer (WTR)

Promotional Specialisations:

 Leadership and Management (L&M, required to become a Leading Seaman)
Seamanship Development Course (not required to become a Seaman)
 General Training Instructor/Petty Officer Qualifications (PO Quals, required to become a Petty Officer)
 Whole Ships Coordinator/Chief Petty Officer Qualifications (CPO Quals, required to become a Chief Petty Officer)

Former specialisations:
 Physical Training Instructor (PTI)
 Cadet Safety Representative (CSR)
 Naval Airman (NA)

Cadets can also attend an advanced course on most of the above specialisations.

Cuff Rates:

CSA (Cadet Special Award) are completed at cadets, camps and ACT (Annual Continuous Training). Cuff rates is a badge you get after completing the course and it is worn on ceremonial uniforms, with a maximum of three to be worn. Cuff rate include:

 Sailing
 Power boating
 Canoeing
 Pulling
 Sailboarding
 Drum Corp
 Bugle Corp
 Duke of Edinburgh Award
 Adventurous Training
 Diving
 Weapons Safety
 Marksmanship
 Parachutist
 First Aid
 Solo Flight

the Adventurous Training Award is run by the Australian Army Cadets and is worn above the readiness badge.

Weekend Postings 

Cadets also have the opportunity to attend Weekend Postings (WEP's), which occur over a period of Friday night to Sunday afternoon. WEP's are opportunities to get extra time to get activities done, and can be useful to run shortened versions of some ACT courses, some of which require to be conducted over two or more WEP's. However, they are most frequently used as opportunities to get on the water in the ANC's watercraft, and can take the form of sailing, powerboating, paddleboarding/canoeing/kayaking.

WEP's are normally conducted with multiple units, with one unit hosting and the others travelling to that unit. Usually, one senior cadet from the host unit is chosen to be the Whole Ships Coordinator (WSC) and they will coordinate the staff and cadets of other units, and are often involved in the planning and preparation stages of the WEP. However, a senior cadet from another unit may sometimes be the WSC, normally if the host unit is lacking senior cadets.

Naval Ship Visits 
Cadets are sometimes given a chance to visit Australian Navy Vessels depending on location of the unit and where the ship is stationed or moored. Whilst on board, cadets will learn about the systems and operation of the vessel.

Membership

All cadets and staff in the ANC are workers of the ADF (Australian Defence Force) in accordance to the workplace health and safety act classifying them as workers but are not required to undertake military service.

Cadet
The age period of membership as a cadet is twelve and a half, turning thirteen on the year of entry, to 31 December in the year the cadet turns eighteen. There is no specific recruitment time, applicants are encouraged to join at any time.

At most Training Ships, a trial period of four weeks is employed. During this trial period, a cadet (ranked as a recruit) is either not issued uniforms, or issued old working rig. They are free to leave at any point of the day but cannot participate in trans-unit activities such as WEP's or ACT's. At the end of this period they are officially appointed as cadets and are issued their correct uniforms.

Staff
All cadet units are staffed by paid officers and instructors (on a training allowance scheme), although some units may also have volunteer instructors. Adult staff involved in the organisation come from a variety of backgrounds and professions including:

 Teachers
 Members of community organisations
 Ex-cadets
 Parents and community members
 Ex-servicemen and women
 Occupational health and safety consultants
 Specialist personnel such as HR, change or occupational health and safety managers, administrators or finance officers
 People who provide support on a continuing or as required basis

Some Cadet Staff are appointed for their professional expertise in instruction or administration. Cadets may apply to become Staff after 1 year after aging out.

The current National Command Authority are;
Captain M. Slattery, RAN – Director General ANC (Acting)
Captain Martin Blume, ANC – National Commander
Commander Richard Trigg, ANC – Director of Flotillas
Commander Lisa Foley, ANC – Director Training
Commander Martin Blume, ANC -Deputy Director Information Systems
 Commander Jared O'Connor, ANC – Director People and Culture.

See also
 Australian Army Cadets
 Australian Air Force Cadets
 Australian Defence Force Cadets
 International Sea Cadet Association
 Other Sea Cadet organisations

Notes

References
 ANP 3700 – Policy and Operating Instructions for the Australian Navy Cadets

External links

 International Sea Cadet Association
 Navy League of Australia Federal Council report
 Australian Defence Force Cadets – Cadetnet
 Royal Australian Navy
 Cadets WA

Cadets
Navy Cadets
Australian cadet organisations
Naval Cadet organisations
1907 establishments in Australia